Mazar-e Seyyed Ali (also Romanized as Mazār-e Seyyed ‘Alī; also known as Emāmzādeh Seyyed ‘Alī, Zīārat-e Seyyed ‘Alī, and Ziyārat Saiyid ‘Ali) is a village in Shusef Rural District, Shusef District, Nehbandan County, South Khorasan Province, Iran. At the 2006 census, its population was 215, in 67 families.

References 

Populated places in Nehbandan County